Boophis opisthodon is a species of frog in the family Mantellidae.
It is endemic to Madagascar.
Its natural habitats are subtropical or tropical dry forests, subtropical or tropical moist lowland forests, swamps, freshwater marshes, intermittent freshwater marshes, and heavily degraded former forest.

References

opisthodon
Endemic frogs of Madagascar
Amphibians described in 1888
Taxonomy articles created by Polbot